James Ballard may refer to:

 J. G. Ballard (1930–2009), English novelist, short story writer and essayist
 James F. Ballard (1851–1931), American entrepreneur and art collector
Jim Ballard (born 1972), American football player
Jim Ballard (swimmer), see 1977 Summer Universiade

See also
Samuel James Ballard (1765–1829), Vice-Admiral in the Royal Navy